The American Academy of Achievement, colloquially known as the Academy of Achievement, is a nonprofit educational organization that recognizes some of the highest-achieving people in diverse fields and gives them the opportunity to meet one another. The academy also brings together the leaders with promising graduate students for mentorship. It hosts an International Achievement Summit, which ends with an awards ceremony, during which new members are inducted into the academy.

History 

Founded in 1961 by Sports Illustrated and LIFE magazine photographer Brian Reynolds, the Academy of Achievement recognizes high achievers in public service, business, science and exploration, sports, and the arts. Reynolds established the academy after realizing that the famous people he photographed from different fields did not usually get to meet one another. A 1989 San Francisco Chronicle article called the organization "little-publicized but immensely powerful". According to William DeVries, who helped develop the first artificial heart, "It is a social network. Like a club. Now I can call Chuck Yeager up, or Philip 'Bo' Knight, and they'll return my calls, ask me out places. I promised myself I would never ask the people here for money, but I know a lot of scientists who do." Reynolds also wanted to bring together highly accomplished leaders with promising students, to inspire them. At the 1990 summit in Chicago, for example, student delegates "rubbed shoulders" with Ronald Reagan, Maya Angelou and Michael Jordan, and in 1995, students met with inductees including George H. W. Bush, Ruth Bader Ginsburg, Lady Bird Johnson, Robin Williams, Mike Krzyzewski and Rosa Parks.

Academy members and summit attendees have also included Jimmy Carter, Colin Powell, Maya Lin, Barbra Streisand, Mikhail Gorbachev, Steven Spielberg, and George Lucas. In 2005, The Washington Post called the summit "one of the world’s most dazzling gatherings of international celebrities - Nobel Prize winners, heads of state, star athletes, titans of industry, scientists and entertainers."

In 1985, Reynolds's son, Wayne Reynolds, took over the leadership, becoming the executive director of the academy. In 1999, he was selected as the board chairman. In the 1990s, Reynolds moved the organization's headquarters from Malibu, California, to Washington, D.C.

In 2007, the Catherine B. Reynolds Foundation donated $9 million to the academy.

Achievement Summit 

The annual summit is attended by graduate students and young innovators from the U.S. and overseas, like Sergey Brin and Larry Page, computer science graduate students who later founded Google. The summits were originally attended by high school students chosen for their academic achievement and extracurricular activities. Preceding the awards dinner are three days of panels, presentations and informal dialogues between the students and inductees. Many inductees return multiple years to participate in the panels, programming and networking.

On September 9, 1961, the academy hosted its first International Achievement Summit. Held in Monterey, California, it included a "Banquet of the Golden Plate" award ceremony, named for the gold-plate service used for special occasions by the Palace Hotel in San Francisco, which provided the service for the ceremony. Physicist Edward Teller was the keynote speaker, and warned of the United States' poor performance in the atomic arms race. Awardees at the inaugural ceremony included engineers Charles Stark Draper and Kelly Johnson, General Douglas MacArthur and film director William Wyler. Other attendees included Nobel laureate Willard Libby (Chemistry, 1960) and future Nobel laureate Luis Walter Alvarez (Physics, 1968). The first honorees were chosen by a national board of governors, but subsequent honorees have been selected by the Golden Plate Awards Council, which consists of Academy awardees.

At the 13th annual summit, held in June 1974 in Salt Lake City, Academy member Leon Jaworski, the Special Prosecutor overseeing the Watergate investigations at the time, said in his keynote address that he expected to win a Supreme Court case to get subpoenaed tapes from President Richard Nixon. Among the awardees at the summit were actor James Stewart, professional athlete John Havlicek, and Nobel Laureate chemist Paul Flory.

The 25th annual American Academy of Achievement Summit took place in 1986 in Washington, D.C. The ceremony was addressed by former inductees Chuck Yeager and Erma Bombeck, and was attended by a group of 390 high school graduates assembled from across the U.S. New members admitted to the academy at the event included boxer Muhammad Ali, filmmaker Steven Spielberg, Nobel Prize laureate Isidor Isaac Rabi, opera singer Leontyne Price, and country singer Loretta Lynn, the first country music artist ever admitted into the academy.

The 2002 summit was held in Dublin, and was hosted by then-Taoiseach (prime minister) and inductee Bertie Ahern. Former President Bill Clinton held private talks during the summit with Irish nationalist politician John Hume that reportedly concerned the conflict in Northern Ireland as well as other international conflicts. New inductees into the academy in 2002 included Clinton, U2 lead singer Bono, and Afghan president Hamid Karzai.

The 50th-anniversary American Academy of Achievement Summit was held in Washington D.C., in October 2012, and was attended by delegates from 29 countries. The five-day event included a dinner at the Supreme Court of the United States, which four of the justices attended. Newly inducted academy members who spoke at the meeting included then-United States Secretary of Defense Leon Panetta and Nobel laureates Roger Tsien and Adam Riess.

The 2021 awards ceremony took place in Los Angeles on December 23. Among the awardees was Katalin Karikó, a biochemist whose research with Drew Weissman underpins the mRNA COVID-19 vaccines.

Notable recipients of the Golden Plate Award

References

External links

Charity Navigator ranking

Charities based in Washington, D.C.
Organizations established in 1961
1961 establishments in California